The Great Syrian Revolt or Revolt of 1925 was a general uprising across the State of Syria and Greater Lebanon during the period of 1925 to 1927.  The leading rebel forces comprised fighters of the Jabal Druze State in southern Syria, joined by Sunni, Druze, Alawite, and Christian factions. The common goal was to end French rule in the newly mandated regions, passed from Turkish to French administration following World War I.

This revolution came in response to the repressive policies pursued by the French authorities under the Mandate for Syria and Lebanon, in dividing Syria into several occupied territories. The new French administration was perceived as being prejudiced against the dominant Arab culture and of intending to change the existing character of the country. In addition resentment was caused by the refusal of the French authorities to set a timetable for the independence of Syria.

This revolution was an extension of the Syrian uprisings that had begun when French colonial forces occupied the coastal regions in early 1920, and continued until late June 1927. While the French army and local collaborators were able to achieve military victory, extensive Syrian resistance obliged the occupying authorities to establish a national government of Syria, under which the divided territories were reunited. In addition parliamentary elections were held as a preliminary step towards the final departure of the French from Syria in 1946.

The Arab region after the First World War 

The First World War led to the collapse or dissolution of the Russian, the Austro-Hungarian, German, and Ottoman empires, the later of which Syria had been part of for centuries. The collapse of the Ottoman Empire encouraged the United Kingdom and France to share its legacy by creating a new colonial concept known as the mandate.

The main idea is that the former geographic possessions of the collapsed states that disappeared at the end of the First World War would be placed under the supervision of the League of Nations; in practice this applied to Germany's colonies in Africa and those regions of Ottoman Empire not retained by Turkey.

Based on this, France took over Syria and Lebanon, while the United Kingdom took Iraq and Mandatory Palestine, and these countries are placed under the direct guardianship of these two countries with an official mandate from the League of Nations, with the task of insuring to these new countries the necessary means to enable them to reach a sufficient degree of political awareness and economic development qualifies them for independence and sovereignty. In the implementation of these plans, negotiations were held between France and the United Kingdom in October 1915 on the determination of the spheres of influence of both countries in the event of the partition of the Ottoman Empire. The secret agreement on the subject was called the Sykes–Picot Agreement after the names of the two negotiators, Britain's Mark Sykes and Frenchman, François Georges-Picot.

Meanwhile, correspondence had been ongoing since 1915 between Sir Henry McMahon and Hussein bin Ali, the Sharif of Mecca in the Hejaz, and as a result of the negotiations between the two parties, The British Empire presented a written commitment, includes the recognition of the independence of the Arabs and support them, and in exchange for this initial promise, Hussein bin Ali is committed to launching a call for the Arab Revolt against the Ottomans.

The Great Arab revolution 

On 6 May 1916, Djemal Pasha executed fourteen Syrian notables in Beirut and Damascus and this was the catalyst for Hussein bin Ali to start the Arab Revolt against the Ottoman Empire. The aim of the revolution, as stated in the Damascus Charter and in the McMahon–Hussein Correspondence, which was based on the Charter, was removing the Ottoman Empire and establishment of an Arab state or union of Arab states including the Arabian Peninsula, Najd, Hejaz in particular and Greater Syria, except Adana, which was considered within Syria in the Damascus Charter. With respect for Britain's interests in southern Iraq, a geographical area that begins in Baghdad and ends in the Persian Gulf.

On 10 June 1916, the Arab Revolt began in Mecca and in November 1916, Hussein bin Ali declared himself "King of the Arabs,"  while the superpowers only recognized him as king of the Hejaz. He had 1,500 soldiers and some of armed tribesmen, Hussein bin Ali's army had no guns and Britain provided him with two cannons that accelerated the fall of Jeddah and Taif.

Then he went to Aqaba, where the second phase of the revolution officially began in late 1917 supported by the British Army that occupied Jerusalem on 9 September 1917 and before the end of the year all of the Mutasarrifate of Jerusalem was under British rule.

In the meantime, the army of Hussein bin Ali was increasing, they were joined by two thousand armed soldiers, led by Abd al-Qadir al-Husayni from Jerusalem. Most of the tribesmen from the surrounding areas joined the revolution.

The Sharifian Army, was formed under the leadership of Hussein bin Ali and his son Faisal and indirectly commanded by the British officer T. E. Lawrence (Lawrence of Arabia). It headed to Syria and clashed with the Ottoman forces in a decisive battle near Ma'an. The war resulted in almost destruction of the seventh army and the second Ottoman army, Ma'an was liberated on 23 September 1918, followed by Amman on 25 September and the day before 26 September, the Ottoman governor and his soldiers had left Damascus to announcing the end of Ottoman Syria.

The Sharifian Army entered Damascus on 30 September 1918 and on 8 October the British Army entered Beirut and General Edmund Allenby entered Syria and met with the Sharifian Army in Damascus.

On 18 October, the Ottomans left Tripoli, Lebanon and Homs and on 26 October 1918, the British and Sharifian Army headed north until they met the last Ottoman forces under the command of Turkish commander Mustafa Kemal Atatürk, and a fierce battle happened near to Aleppo in an area later renamed "the English Tomb". On 30 October 1918, the Armistice of Mudros was concluded and Ottoman forces surrendered and the Ottoman Empire abandoned the Levant, Iraq, Hejaz, 'Asir and Yemen.

Arab Kingdom of Syria 

After the demise of Ottoman rule, Prince Faisal announced the establishment of an Arab government in Damascus and assigned the former Ottoman officer in Damascus, Ali Rikabi (Ali Rida Pasha Rikabi) to form and preside it as a military governor.

It included three ministers from the former Mount Lebanon Mutasarrifate, one from Beirut, one from Damascus and Sati' al-Husri from Aleppo and the defence minister from Iraq. Trying to imply that this government represents Greater Syria and was not just a government of local Syria, Prince Faisal appointed Major General Shukri al-Ayyubi military governor of Beirut, Jameel Al-Madfaai governor of Amman, Abdulhamid al-Shalaji as commander of Damascus, and Ali Jawdat al-Ayyubi as governor of Aleppo.

Prince Faisal sought to build a Syrian Army capable of establishing security and stability and preserving the state entity to be declared. He asked the British to arm this army, but they refused. In late 1918 Prince Faisal was invited to participate in the Paris Peace Conference that was held after the First World War in Versailles. He made calls on both the French and British governments who, while collaborating behind his back in amending the Sykes–Picot Agreement, assured the prince of their good intentions towards Syria. 

Faisal proposed at the conference to establish three Arab governments; respectively in Hejaz, Syria and Iraq. However, the United States proposed the mandate system, and sent a referendum committee, the King–Crane Commission, to gauge the political wishes of the people and the French and the British reluctantly agreed.

Prince Faisal returned to Syria on 23 April 1919 in preparation for the visit of the King–Crane Commission, and he appointed Awni Abd al-Hadi to membership of the peace conference. A sizeable meeting was held under Mohammad Fawzi Al-Azm at the Arab Club Hall in Damascus.

Prince Faisal gave the opening speech in which he explained the purpose and nature of the King–Crane Commission. The King–Crane Commission, which lasted for 42 days, visited 36 Arab cities and listened to 1,520 delegations from different villages all of them demanded independence and unity. On 3 July 1919, the delegation of the Syrian Conference met with the King–Crane Commission. It informed them of their request for the independence of Greater Syria and the establishment of a monarchy.

After the King–Crane Commission concluded its work, its recommendations stated that "the Levant rejects foreign control, and it is proposed to impose the mandate system under the tutelage of the League of Nations, as the Arabs are unanimously agreed that Prince Faisal should be a king on the Arab lands without fragmentation."

The King–Crane Commission delivered its report to the United States President, Woodrow Wilson on 28 August 1919, who was ill. The report was ignored after Wilson changed his position because of opposition from senior United States politicians in the Senate (Congress), for violating the isolationist policy followed by the United States since 1833, which requires non-intervention in the affairs of Europe and the non-interference of Europe with the affairs of the United States.

Under pressure, Prince Faisal accepted an agreement with France represented by its prime minister Georges Clemenceau, known as the Faisal Clemenceau Agreement. Among the most prominent of its items:

 The French Mandate for Syria, while the country retains its internal independence, and Syria's cooperation with France about foreign and financial relations, and that Syrian ambassadors abroad reside within the French embassies.
 Recognition of Lebanon's independence under full French tutelage, and the borders to be set by allies without Beirut.
 Organization of the Druze of Hauran and Golan in a federation within the Syrian state.

In late June 1919, Prince Faisal convened the Syrian National Congress, That was considered as a parliament of the Levant and was composed of 85 members, but France prevented some deputies from coming to Damascus. The conference opened with the presence of 69 deputies and among the most prominent of its member:

 Taj al-Din al-Hasani and Fawzi al-Azm representing Damascus
 Ibrahim Hananu representing the Harem District
 Saadallah al-Jabiri, Reza Al-Rifai, Mar'i Pasha al-Mallah and Dr. Abdul Rahman Kayali representing Aleppo
 Fadel Al-Aboud representing Deir ez-Zor and the Euphrates valley area
 Hikmat al-Hiraki representing Maarat al-Numan
 Abdul Qader Kilani and Khalid Barazi representing Hama
 Amin Husseini and Aref al-Dajani representing Jerusalem
 Salim Ali Salam, Aref Al Nomani, and Jamil Beyhoum representing Beirut
 Rashid Rida and Tawfiq El Bissar representing Tripoli
 Said Taliea and Ibrahim Khatib representing Mount Lebanon

Hashim al-Atassi was elected president of the Syrian National Congress, and Mar'i Pasha al-Mallah and Yusuf al-Hakim were vice-presidents. The Syrian National Congress decided to reject the Faisal Clemenceau agreement, demanding the unity and independence of Syria, accepting the mandate of the United States and Britain and rejecting the French mandate, but that the concept of the mandate is limited on technical assistance only.

The relationship between Faisal and French General Henri Gouraud was strained, following Faisal's retreat from his agreement with the French and his bias to the people. The Syrian government has requested 30,000 military uniforms to organize the army. On the other hand, the Clemenceau government fell in France and was replaced by the extreme right-wing government of Alexandre Millerand. Later, France disputed the agreement, and In mid-November 1919, British Armed Forces began withdrawing from Syria after a one-year presence.

On 8 March 1920, the Syrian National Congress was held in Damascus under the leadership of Hashim al-Atassi and in the presence of Prince Faisal and members of the government. It lasted for two days with the participation of 120 members and came up with the following decisions:
 The independence of Syria as a country with its natural borders.
 His Royal Highness Prince Faisal bin Al Hussein was unanimously elected constitutional monarch over the country.
 The political system of the state is a civil, parliamentary, royal.
 Appointment of a civil property government, where Ali Reza Al-Rikabi was appointed as the commander-in-Chief of the Government and Yusuf al-Azma as the Syrian Minister of Defence The official language becoming Arabic  instead of Turkish in all government institutions, civil and military official departments, and schools. Replacing the Ottoman lira with the Egyptian pound and later the Syrian pound.
 Rejecting the Zionist, Balfour Declaration to make Palestine a national home for Jews.
 Reject British and French tutelage over Arabs.

The Allies refused to recognize the new state and decided in April 1920 at the San Remo conference in Italy to divide the country into four areas under which Syria and Lebanon would be subject to the French mandate, the Emirate of Transjordan and Palestine to the British Mandate for Palestine. Although the Lebanon and Syrian coasts, as well as Palestine, were not under the military rule of the Arab Kingdom of Syria, as the Allied armies had been there since the end of the First World War.

The government and the Syrian National Congress rejected the decisions of the San Remo conference and informed the Allied States of its decision between 13 and 21 May 1920. The voices were rising in Syria for an alliance with Mustafa Kemal Atatürk in the Turkish War of Independence or the Bolshevik Revolution in Russia, and meetings were held.

However, these meetings did not lead to a result because Atatürk was using the Syrians to improve the terms of his negotiations with the French and he turned his back to the Syrians. He concluded an agreement with France known as the Treaty of Ankara (Franklin-Bouillon Agreement) in 1921, which included a waiver of the French occupation authority from the northern Syrian territories and withdrawal of the French Army, and hand them over to Turkey.

Syria under the French Mandate 

The proclamation of the establishment of the Arab Kingdom of Syria had internal implications, reflecting tensions within both Syria and Lebanon. Muslims had attacked Christian villages in the Beqaa Valley in response to statements by the Maronite Patriarch Elias Peter Hoayek and the Board of Directors of Mount Lebanon, opposing the independence of Lebanon.

On 5 July 1920, Faisal dispatched his advisor Nuri al-Said to meet with the French General, Henri Gouraud, in Beirut. Nuri al-Said returned to Damascus on 14 July 1920 with a document known as the Gouraud ultimatum and Faisal was given four days to accept it. The ultimatum included five points:

 Acceptance of the French Mandate.
 Adoption of paper money issued by the Bank of Syria and Lebanon in Paris.
 Approval of the French occupation of railway stations in Riyaq, Homs, Aleppo and Hama.
 Dissolution of the Syrian Army plus the cessation of forced recruitment and attempts to arm.
 Punish of those involved in hostilities against France.

King Faisal gathered his ministers to discuss the matter, and many of them agreed with Gouraud's terms and accepted the ultimatum. However, the position of the Minister of Defence, Yusuf al-Azma, was strongly opposed to accepting the ultimatum, and tried, by all means, to discourage King Faisal from responding to the French threat to dissolve the Syrian Army.

The Syrian government's acceptance of General Gouraud's ultimatum and abandoning the idea of resistance, and demobilizing of the Syrian Army and withdrawing soldiers from the village of Majdal Anjar was seen to be in violation of the decision of the Syrian National Congress. The general opinion of the people was voiced by loud demonstrations condemning the ultimatum, those who accepted it, and sending King Faisal a letter to Gouraud to accept the terms and dissolve the army.

The French Armed Forces began to march led by General Goabiah (by order of General Gouraud) towards Damascus on 24 July 1920, while the Syrian Army stationed on the border was retreating and dissolving, and when General Gouraud was asked about this, replied that Faisal's letter for approving the ultimatum terms reached him after the deadline.

There was only one choice and that was resistance until death, and this opinion was headed by Minister of Defence, Yusuf al-Azma, who worked to bring together the rest of the army with hundreds of volunteers who chose this resolution and headed to resist the invading French forces that marching towards Damascus.

Yusuf al-Azma wanted to preserve the prestige and dignity of Syria's military history, was afraid to record in the history books that the Syrian Army stayed away from fighting and that the military occupation of his capital had happened without resistance. He also wanted to inform the Syrian people that their army carried the banner of resistance against the French occupation from the first moment, and that they would be a beacon for them in their resistance against the military occupation.

General Goabiah's forces consisted of the following:

 an infantry brigade (415)
 2nd Regiment of Algerian Tirailleurs
 a brigade of Senegalese Tirailleurs
 Moroccan Spahis Regiment

The French forces totalled nine thousand soldiers, supported by many aircraft, tanks and machine guns, while the Syrian Army did not exceeded 3,000 soldiers most of them volunteers.

On 24 July 1920, the Battle of Maysalun began, when the French artillery began to overcome the Syrian artillery, French tanks began advancing towards the front line of the defending forces, and then French Senegalese soldiers began attacking the left side of the Syrian Army, which was composed mainly of volunteers, and some traitors attacked the Syrian Army from behind and killed many soldiers and robbed their weapons. Despite all, Yusuf al-Azma was unconcerned and remained steadfast and determined.

Yusuf al-Azma had planted land mines on the heads of the valley of Alqarn, a corridor used by the French Army, in the hope that when the tanks attack into, the land mines explode. However, the traitors had already cut off the mines wires, and some of them were caught during the operation, but it was too late. When the tanks approached, Yusuf al-Azma gave the order to detonate the land mines but they did not explode. He examined them and saw that most of them had been disabled. Then he heard an uproar from behind and when he turned, saw many of his armies and volunteers had fled after a bomb fell from one of the aircraft. So he grabbed his rifle and fired at the enemy until he was killed on Wednesday, 24 July 1920.

Policy of the French Mandate in Syria 

After France obtained control over the entire Syrian territories they resorted to the fragmentation of Syria into several independent states or entities:

 State of Damascus (1920).
 State of Aleppo (1920).
 Alawite State (1920).
 The State of Greater Lebanon (1920).
 Jabal Druze State (1921).
 Sanjak of Alexandretta (1921).

The northern Syrian territory was given to Turkey during the Treaty of Ankara on 20 October 1921, and the boundary of the border between the colonial power and Turkey.

To tear the national unity of the country and weaken national resistance to the French mandate, General Gouraud resorted to the policy pursued by General Hubert Lyautey in Morocco. It is a policy of isolating cohesive religious and ethnic minorities from the mainstream in the country, under the pretext of defending their rights and equity, and incite the rural and Bedouin against urban.

The causes of the revolution 

The outbreak of the revolution had many reasons, the most important of which are:

 The Syrians rejected the French occupation of their country, and sought full independence.
 Tearing Syria into several small states (Aleppo, Druze, Alawites, Damascus).
 The great economic damage caused to the Syrian merchants as a result of the policy adopted by the French in Syria, where the French dominated the economic aspects and linked the Syrian and Lebanese pounds to the French franc.
 The military dictatorship practiced by the French generals during their mandate.  Fighting the Arab culture of the country and trying to replace it with the French culture and appointing the French to top positions.
 The abolition of freedoms in Syria and the pursuit of nationalists and provoke sectarianism, which led to the discontent of the Syrians.  The meeting between the leaders of the Jabal Druze State and the French high commissioner in Syria failed, where the Druze leaders expressed their displeasure with the policy of French General, Gabriel Carbillet, and demanded that another governor replace him. However, the high commissioner insulted them and threatened them with harsh punishment if they stuck to their position. As a result, Sultan al-Atrash declared that a revolution was necessary to achieve independence.

In the opinion of Dr. Abd al-Rahman Shahbandar, the above reasons are the distant causes of the revolution. The primary reasons are General Carbillet's antagonism to the Al-Atrash family and attempts to crush their influence and jailed everyone who dealt with them, prompting Sultan al-Atrash to declare a revolution.

The demands of the revolution 
The most prominent demands of the revolution:

 Unity of the Syrian country with its coast and inside, and the recognition of one Syrian Arab fully independent state
 The establishment of a popular government that gathers Syrian National Congress to draw up a fundamental law on the principle of absolute sovereignty of the nation
 Withdrawal of the occupying forces from Syria and the formation of a national army to maintain security
 Upholding the principles of the French Revolution and human rights in freedom, equality and fraternity.

The course and events of the revolution 

Colonel Catro, who was dispatched by General Gouraud to Jabal al-Druze, sought to isolate the Druze from the Syrian national movement, he signed on 4 March 1921 a treaty with the Druze tribes, which stipulated that Jabal al-Druze would form a particular administrative unit independent of the State of Damascus with a local governor and an elected representative council. In exchange for the Druze's recognition of the French mandate, the result of the treaty appointed Salim al-Atrash as the first ruler of the Jabal Druze State.

The Jabal Druze inhabitants were not comfortable with the new French administration and the first clash with it occurred in July 1922 with the arrest of Adham Khanjar, who was coming to Sultan al-Atrash carrying a letter to him. The French arrested him for his involvement in the attack on General Gouraud in Hauran, Sultan al-Atrash asked the French commander in As-Suwayda to hand him over Adham Khanjar and he replied him that Khanjar was on his way to Damascus. So Sultan al-Atrash commissioned a group of his supporters to attack the armed convoy accompanying the detainee, but the French managed to transfer him to Lebanon and on 30 May 1923, executed him in Beirut.

The French destroyed the house of Sultan al-Atrash in Al-Qurayya in late August 1922 in response to his attack on their forces, then Sultan al-Atrash led the Druze rebels for a year in a guerrilla war against the French forces. France brought a large force to crush the rebels, that forced Sultan al-Atrash to seek refuge in Transjordan in the late summer of 1922. Under British pressure, Sultan al-Atrash gave himself up to the French in April 1923 after agreeing to a truce.

Salim Al-Atrash died poisoned in Damascus in 1924; the French appointed captain Carbillet as governor of the Jabal Druze State, contrary to the agreement with the Druze, Where he abused the people and exposed them to forced labour and persecution nad sent them to prison. He also worked on the implementation of a policy of divide and conquer by inciting farmers against their feudal lords, especially the Al-Atrash family. This led the people of As-Suwayda to go out in a mass protest against the practices of the French authorities, which accelerated the outbreak of the revolution.

The Druze were fed up with the practices of captain Carbillet, which led them to send a delegation to Beirut on 6 June 1925 to submit a document requesting the High Commissioner of the Levant, Maurice Sarrail, to appoint a Druze governor of the Jabal Druze instead of captain Carbillet because of his practices against the people of the Jabal Druze State. Some of these practices, according to memoirs of Abd al-Rahman Shahbandar, are:

 Allocate several gendarmes to beat and humiliate people in fulfillment of the wishes of captain Carpier and his entourage.
 Hamed Karkout (from the village of Thebeen) was detained for five months without cause or trial; he was insulted and beaten in the morning and evening.
 Husayn Kabul (from the village of Kafr al-Lehaf) was whipped until his skin was torn because he neglected to greet General Diocheil when he passed the highway.
 Wahba al-Ashmoush was arrested in As-Suwayda and severely beaten because he refused to rent his house.
 General Diocheil fired several shots from his pistol at Mohammed Bey al-Halabi, the director of the Justice Department, and he was not punished for his criminal work.
 Hussein Saddiq was arrested and imprisoned for 15 days, for not receiving captain Carbillet, and fined 25 golden pounds for the village because it did not receive him luxuriously. This fine was imposed on the village of Arman for the same reason.
 Fahd Bey Al-Atrash was arrested and severely beaten without investigation, based on a simple tale from a spy.
 Imposing ten golden pounds as a fine on As-Suwayda people for the loss of a cat of the wife of a French garrison officer.

High commissioner Sarrail expelled the Jabal Druze State delegation and refused to meet them and notified them that they must leave Beirut quickly and return to their country or he will exile them to Palmyra, and this was the direct cause of the outbreak of the Syrian revolution, where Sultan al-Atrash called for a meeting in As-Suwayda. Demonstrations occurred throughout the Jabal Druze State.

Contacts were made with some political leaders in Damascus, headed by Abd al-Rahman Shahbandar, president of the People's Party, to consult and coordinate positions, although the People's Party had declared that it sought to achieve its principles and program by lawful means. However, some of its members personally have pledged with a Jabal Druze delegation to ignite the revolution in Syria, and cooperate in expelling the French from Syria and achieve independence and unity.

At that time, it was clear to Abd al-Rahman Shahbandar that Syria is in the throes of the revolution and that the Syrian people would gain their freedom and independence. He started communicating with the leaders and notables of the Syrian cities to urge them to revolt against French colonialism and motivated their national feelings and asked them to start an armed struggle for independence. Shahbandar's goal was to disperse the French forces geographically to weaken their strength and to relieve pressure from the capital Damascus and Jabal al-Druze.

To achieve this goal, Abd al-Rahman Shahbandar communicated with the leader Ibrahim Hananu in the northern region. Who was one of the first stragglers against the French colonial forces since 1920, where rebel operations in the northern region lasted until 15 April 1926, one of the most important battles that took place during this period was the battle of Tel Ammar, which was the last battles of the revolution in that region.

Shahbandar also met with leader Mohammed Al-Ayyash in Damascus and agreed with him to extend the revolution to the eastern region. Mohammed Al-Ayyash was able to form revolutionary groups to strike the French forces in Deir ez-Zor, and the rebels succeeded in carrying out strikes against the French forces. One of these was killing of French officers in the Ain Albu Gomaa area on the road between Deir ez-Zor and Raqqa.

As a result of the operation, French planes bombed the villages of the city; it was a horrific and devastating bombardment where the houses were destroyed on the heads of children and women and killed the livestock and burned farms and crops, some civilians were killed. Many were wounded by bullets and shrapnel from the bombing.

Revolutionaries were tried in Aleppo and in August 1925, the French high commissioner in Beirut, Maurice Sarrail, issued Decision No. 49S / 5, which ordered the exile of all members of the Ayyash Al-Haj family to the city of Jableh, Mahmoud Al-Ayyash (Abu Stita) and 12 of his companions were sentenced to death. The execution was carried out by firing squad on 15 September 1925 in the city of Aleppo. Mohammed Al-Ayyash was sentenced to 20 years imprisonment in the city of Tartus on the island of Arwad.

Shortly after, while the Ayyash Al-Haj family were living in Jableh, the French authorities assassinated Ayyash Al-Haj in a café outside the city by poisoning his coffee, and prevented the transfer of his body to Deir ez-Zor for reasons of public security, He was buried in Jableh in the cemetery of Sultan Ibrahim ibn Adham Mosque where the absent prayers held for the spirit of this martyr mujahid in all the Syrian cities.

Abd al-Rahman Shahbandar was in contact with Commander Fawzi al-Qawuqji, who was preparing to set up the revolution in the city of Hama. However, he was known for his intense loyalty to the French. Despite this, he received In their army a high rank and a position (the National Army Command in Hama) rarely held by other Syrians. However, according to Shahbandar's memoirs, Al-Qawuqji was upset with the humiliation of the elders and scholars of Hama, division of the country, improper appointments to high positions, raising of taxes on people, and stirring sectarian strife among the Syrian people.

On 4 October 1925, Al-Qawuqji declared a revolution in Hama and its environs. It would have almost taken over the city had it not been for the heavy bombing of popular neighbourhoods. He went to the desert to provoke the tribes against the French and relieve pressure on the rebels in other regions, and achieved significant victories over the French troops, garrisons and barracks and inflicted heavy losses on them; even the National Revolutionary Council entrusted him with leading the revolution in the Ghouta region and granting him broad powers.

On 11 July 1925, French high commissioner Maurice Sarrail sent a secret letter to his delegate in Damascus asking him to summon some of the leaders of the Jabal al-Druze under the pretext of discussing with them their demands, to arrest them and exile them to Palmyra and Al-Hasakah. This was done and Uqlat al-Qatami, Prince Hamad al-Atrash, Abdul Ghaffar al-Atrash, and Naseeb al-Atrash were exiled to Palmyra, while Barjas al-Homoud, Hosni Abbas, Ali al-Atrash, Yusuf al-Atrash, and Ali Obaid were exiled to Al-Hasakah.

As a result of French policies and practices, Sultan al-Atrash declared the revolution on 21 July 1925 by broadcasting a political and military statement calling on the Syrian people to revolt against the French mandate.

Al-Atrash started military attacks on French forces and burned the French Commission's house in Salkhad, the second-largest city in the mountain after As-Suwayda and occupied it. In early September 1925, Atrash attacked a French force in the town of Al-Kafr under the command of Captain Norman and killed most of the soldiers, where the number of rebels did not exceed two hundred while the number of soldiers exceeded two hundred and sixty, including a large number of French officers, and killed 40 rebels, including Mustafa Atrash brother of Sultan al-Atrash.

Sarail was determined to defeat his troops and ordered an extensive campaign to discipline rebels, including more than 5,000 soldiers, led by General Michaud, equipped with the best and latest tanks and military aircraft. On the first day of August 1925, the campaign clashed with rebel forces in the town of Izra; the number of revolutionaries was about three thousand. The rebels were defeated in the battle, as soon as evening came, the rebels attacked the rear of the French forces, where ammunition and supplies were seized and killed many French soldiers.

The following morning, 117 came from As-Suwayda and joined by 400 rebels from Majdal Shams, Najran, Salim and other nearby villages. They clashed with the French forces in the village of Al-Mazraa, where the French forces were annihilated. Only about 1,200 soldiers fled to the railway in the village of Izra to board the train going to Damascus. Hamad al-Barbour, Sultan al-Atrash`s right hand man was killed in the battle.

On 20 August 1925, the People's Party sent a delegation to meet with Sultan al-Atrash and discuss the accession of Damascus to the revolution; the delegation included Tawfiq al-Halabi, Asaad al-Bakri, and Zaki al-Droubi. The presence of the delegation coincided with the presence of Captain Reno, who was negotiating with the rebels on behalf of the French authorities to conclude a peace treaty, and the People's Party delegation managed to convince the rebels not to sign the treaty. In late August 1925, the leaders of the People's Party, including Abd al-Rahman Shahbandar, met with Sultan al-Atrash in the village of Kafr al-Lehaf and agreed to mobilize five hundred rebels to attack Damascus from three axis, but Al-Atrash could not mobilize this number. The military forces that General Ghamlan began to mobilize along the railway in Horan led the rebel leaders to abandon the plan to attack Damascus and devote themselves to the French campaign.

The rebels agreed to march towards the village of Al-Musayfirah to confront the new French campaign. On 17 September 1925, they launched a night attack on the French troops quartered there, and victory would have been theirs if it had not been for the intervention of French aircraft that forced them to withdraw. The French casualties were more than 900 soldiers, In addition to destroying many equipment and vehicles, while the rebels lost less than 200 fighters. Then there were battles between the rebels and the creeping French forces towards As-Suwayda, and the French were forced after a temporary occupation of the city to withdraw after the revolutionary command decided to extend its scope to the north to relieve the pressure on Jabal al-Druze.

On 4 October 1925, Fawzi al-Qawuqji led the rebels and Bedouins of the Mawali tribe in and around Maarat al-Numan. He would have taken Hama, if it had not been for the intervention of French planes and the commitment of the leaders of the city to neutrality. They waited in their homes to see the result of the revolution. If it was successful they will be its founders, and if it fails they will be far from its consequences. This does not mean that the Hama revolution did not bear fruit, on the contrary, it led to the withdrawal of French forces from the city of As-Suwayda at the request of the French high commissioner Sarail to support the French garrison in the city of Hama.

The revolution spread to the Ghouta of Damascus and there were fierce battles between the rebels led by Hasan al-Kharrat and the French. The first battles were in the village of Al-Malihah, or what the rebels called the first battle of Al-Zour, in which several French soldiers were killed On 18 October 1925, the rebels entered Damascus, headed by Nasib al-Bakri, they were joined by the rebels from Al-Shaghur rebels and Bab al-Salam led by Hasan al-Kharrat, The rebels remained for four days, crushing all the soldiers in the barricades of Al-Shaghur neighbourhood and Al-Midan, and the French soldiers were forced to take refuge in the Citadel of Damascus with their families.

Sarail ordered his troops to bomb Damascus with artillery from the Citadel of Damascus, which destroyed more than 600 homes, and French soldiers looted warehouses and shops. The rebels decided to kidnap General Sarail after they learned that he came to Damascus to visit the Azm Palace in Bazouriyeh, so they entered the city from the side of the Al-Shaghur and arrived at the palace, but Sarail had left him quickly. The rebels clashed with the French soldiers and caught fire in the palace for the ferocity of the battle. Fighting continued between the Ghouta rebels and the French forces, the Second Battle of Al-Zour took place on 17 November 1925, the battle of Yalda and Babbila on 19 November 1925, the battle of Hamura on 17 December 1925, and the battle of Al-Nabek on 14 and 15 March 1926.

In late October 1925, the rebels of the Jabal al-Druze gathered in the northern Almeqren and then marched west, occupying the region of Alblan and then the town of Hasbaya without any resistance from the French garrison, whose leader preferred to withdraw when he learned the arrival of the rebels. The rebels then went to the town of Rashaya after learning that a decisive battle had taken place between the town's Druze and its French garrison, and after heavy fighting, they managed to enter its castle and occupy it.

The Syrian rebels entered the stage of attrition as the revolution extended and suffered from a lack of ammunition and supplies, which helped the French forces to besiege and tighten the screws on them by bringing more supporting troops, Al-Atrash refused to surrender to the French and was sentenced to death. He was forced, with a group of rebels to flee to Azraq in the emirate of eastern Jordan, but the English did not allow them to stay for long, so they fled to Wadi al-Sarhan and al-Nabek in northern Saudi Arabia, then to Al-Karak in Jordan.

Sultan al-Atrash and his comrades returned home after France issued a comprehensive amnesty for all the rebels following the signing of the Franco-Syrian Treaty of Independence in 1936, where Al-Atrash and his comrades were received in Damascus on 18 May 1937 with grand public celebrations.

Syrian cities participating in the revolution

Jabal al-Arab and Horan (Sultan al-Atrash) 
Sultan al-Atrash was a prominent Syrian nationalist leader and commander general of the Syrian Revolution (1925–27), He fought against the Ottomans, the French, and even against the Syrian government during its dictatorship, One of the most influential figures in Syrian and Druze history, he played a major role in deciding the destiny of Jabal al-Druze and of Syria in general.

He was captured and later executed in 1911. His son, Mansur al-Atrash was an active member in the Syrian Regional Branch of the Ba'ath Party until the 1966 Syrian coup d'état led to the downfall of Michel Aflaq, Salah al-Din al-Bitar, Munif Razzaz and the classical Ba'athists in general. His granddaughter, Naila Al Atrash, is a dramatist and activist against the Assad regime.

In 1925 Sultan al-Atrash led a revolt which broke out in the Jabal al-Druze and spread to engulf the whole of Syria and parts of Lebanon, this is considered one of the most important revolutions against the French mandate, as it encompassed the whole of Syria and witnessed fierce battles between rebel and French forces.

The rebel forces led by Sultan al-Atrash were supported by the Communist Party of Syria and Lebanon (CPSL). The CPSL broadcast in French, Arabic and Armenian languages that the rebellion was in support of "the great Syrian Revolution" and coordinated with "the international communist movement". 

On 23 August 1925 Sultan al-Atrash officially declared revolution against France, and soon fighting erupted in Damascus, Homs and Hama. Al-Atrash won several battles against the French at the beginning of the revolution, notably the Battle of al-Kafr on 21 July 1925, the Battle of al-Mazraa on 2 August 1925, and the battles of Salkhad, al-Musayfirah and As-Suwayda. The Druze were defeated in the last two battles. After rebel victories against France, it sent thousands of troops to Syria and Lebanon from Morocco and Senegal, equipped with modern weapons, compared to the few supplies of the rebels. This dramatically altered the results and allowed the French to regain many cities, although resistance lasted until the spring of 1927. The French sentenced Sultan al-Atrash to death, but he had escaped with the rebels to Transjordan and was eventually pardoned, He returned to Syria in 1937 after the signing of the Franco-Syrian Treaty the year before.

Al-Atrash participated actively in the Levant Crisis, that led to Syrian independence. In 1948 he called for the establishment of a unified Arab Liberation Army of Palestine, for which hundreds of young people had already volunteered and sent to participate in during the 1948 Arab–Israeli War.

During the reign of Adib Shishakli, Al-Atrash was often harassed because of his opposition to government policy, he left the Jabal al-Druze for Jordan in December 1954 and came back when Adib Shishakl's regime fell, Al-Atrash supported the United Arab Republic of Egypt and Syria in 1958, and firmly opposed the process of separation in 1961. He is also known for his contributions to social life and development in the Jabal al-Druze.

Al-Atrash died on 26 March 1982 from a heart attack, His funeral was attended by more than a million people, and the president of Syrian Arab Republic, Hafez al-Assad issued an individual letter mourning Al-Atrash as the General Commander of the Great Syrian Revolt.

Damascus (Abd al-Rahman Shahbandar) 

Abd al-Rahman Shahbandar was a prominent Syrian nationalist during the French mandate and a leading opponent of compromise with French authority. His devotion to Arab nationalism dated to the days of the Committee of Union and Progress and its Turkification policies. He supported the Arab Revolt during the First World War and briefly headed the foreign ministry under Emir Faisal.

When France occupied Syria in July 1920, he fled the country. Shahbandar returned in 1921 and organized the Iron Hand Society to agitate against French rule. This was the first Syrian nationalist group to emerge in Damascus during the Mandate and Shahbandar organized its spread to Homs and Hama. In April 1922, the French arrested him and other Iron Hand leaders for incitement against their rule. The arrests triggered several demonstrations and bloody confrontations between protesters and French forces in Damascus. Nonetheless, the French tried Shahbandar for subversive activities and sentenced him to 20 years of imprisonment.

After serving 18 months of his sentence, the French sent him into exile, where he joined the activities of the Syrian-Palestine Congress based in Cairo. The French allowed him to return to Syria in 1924. The following year Shahbandar guided the formation of Syria's first nationalist party, the People's Party. He then helped organize the spread of the Syrian Revolution from Jabal Druze State to the rest of Syria. He eluded the French authorities and moved to Jabal al-Druze for the duration of the revolt. There he and Sultan al-Atrash formed a provisional government. When the revolution collapsed in 1927, Shahbandar fled to Transjordan and from there to Egypt.

In 1937 a French amnesty allowed him to return from exile, and he directed his supporters to oppose the Franco-Syrian Treaty of Independence because it granted France privileges that detracted from Syrian sovereignty. He was joined by powerful Syrian politicians such as Munir al-Ajlani. He also directed a political campaign to discredit the National Bloc government of Prime Minister Jamil Mardam Bey. During the Second World War, the French considered cooperating with Shahbandar because of his opposition to the National Bloc and because of support for him from Britain and the Hashemites. In June 1940, he was assassinated in Damascus. The French accused several prominent National Bloc figures, including Jamil Mardam and Saadallah al-Jabiri, of plotting the murder, and they fled to Iraq. While Shahbandar was one of Syria's most popular leaders, he never built up an organization that would perpetuate his political legacy.

Ghouta of Damascus (Hasan al-Kharrat)

Hasan al-Kharrat was one of the principal Syrian rebel commanders of the Great Syrian Revolt against the French mandate. His main area of operations was in Damascus and its Ghouta countryside. He was killed in the struggle and is considered a hero by Syrians. 

As the qabaday (local youths boss) of the Al-Shaghur quarter of Damascus, al-Kharrat was connected with Nasib al-Bakri, a nationalist from the quarter's most influential family. At al-Bakri's invitation, al-Kharrat joined the revolt in August 1925 and formed a group of fighters from Al-Shaghur and other neighbourhoods in the vicinity. He led the rebel assault against Damascus, briefly capturing the residence of French High Commissioner of the Levant, Maurice Sarrail before withdrawing amid heavy French bombardment.

Towards the end of 1925, relations grew tense between al-Kharrat and other rebel leaders, particularly Sa'id al-As and Ramadan al-Shallash, as they traded accusations of plundering villages or extorting local inhabitants. Al-Kharrat continued to lead operations in the Ghouta, ultimately killed in a French ambush. The revolt dissipated by 1927, but he gained a lasting reputation as a martyr of the Syrian resistance to French rule.

Deir ez-Zor (Ayash Al-Haj family) 

The Ayyash Al-Haj family was subjected to the brutality of the French military authorities after accusing them of preparing for the revolution of the Euphrates valley in conjunction with the outbreak of the Great Syrian Revolution. The struggle of the family began with the meeting of Mohammed Al-Ayyash, the eldest son of leader Ayyash Al-Haj, with Abd al-Rahman Shahbandar, leader of the People's Party in Damascus and they agreed to extend the revolution to the Euphrates region and open a new front against the French to disperse their forces and ease the pressure on the rebels of Ghouta and Jabal al-Druze.

After Mohammed Al-Ayyash returned from Damascus he started to rouse the enthusiasm of the people of Deir ez-Zor and encourage them to fight. He agreed with his brother Mahmoud Al-Ayyash (Abu Stita) to go to the villages of the Albu Saraya clan that were living west of Deir ez-Zor, and which had a strong friendship with his father Ayyash Al-Haj, to form revolutionary groups with them to strike the French forces.

Mohammed Al-Ayyash managed to form a revolutionary group of thirteen armed men who were ready to take military action against the French forces. Some people were working with the French at translation centres and other places but they were at the service of the revolutionaries. They were reporting to Mohammed Al-Ayyash about the situation and movements of the French, and their activities, along the timing of their military operations. Mohammed Al-Ayyash led the revolutionaries against the French forces.

The revolutionaries managed to carry out strikes against the French, and the last attack was on a car carrying officers and their driver in the Ain Albu Gomaa area, on the road between Deir ez-Zor and Raqqa. The revolutionaries attacked and arrested the officers and took them with their car, first taking their weapons, to a desert called Al-Aksiyya, and threw them, with their driver, in one of the abandoned wells where they died.

The French, concerned over losing their officers, began a search campaign, including planes. When they found their bodies and inquired from the informants about the names of the revolutionaries, the sent a large military force equipped with heavy guns and planes to attack Albu Saraya clan and blockade it.

French planes began bombing the villages of the clan. Some civilians were killed and among them were Hanash Al-Mousa Al-Ani, Ali Al-Najras, and a woman who was pregnant, many were wounded by bullets and shrapnel., All of this was to pressure on the people to surrender the revolutionaries.

Eventually the French became convinced that the bombing would not work. They then threatened to arrest the women of the revolutionaries, their mothers and sisters until the revolutionaries surrendered themselves, When the revolutionaries heard the news , they emerged from their hideouts and surrendered.

The revolutionaries were tried in Aleppo, where the family of Ayyash Al-Haj appointed the lawyer, Fathallah Al-Saqqal to defend her, The court heard the head of the French intelligence in Deir ez-Zor, who said: If each of the criminals, who committed this terrible offence deserve dying once, the gang leader Mohammed Al-Ayyash deserves hanging twice.

Idlib (Ibrahim Hanano) 

Ibrahim Hananu was born to a wealthy family in Kafr Takharim and raised in Aleppo. There is dispute on his birth date: one source mentions he was born in 1879, while another mentions he was born in 1869. He studied at the Imperial High School in Aleppo, and continued his studies at the Ottoman Law Academy of the prestigious Mülkiye school in Constantinople. As a student, he joined the Committee of Union and Progress, the political organ that later took stage following the Young Turk Revolution of 1908.

Breaking out in the autumn of 1919 in the countryside surrounding Aleppo, when the French army had landed on the Syrian coast and was preparing to occupy all of Syria, Hananu launched his revolt, bringing Aleppo, Idlib and Antioch into a coordinated campaign against French forces. Hananu was responsible for the disarmament of many French troops, the destruction of railroads and telegraph lines, the sabotage of tanks, and the foiling of French attacks on Aleppo. On 23 July 1920, when the French army successfully attacked Aleppo, Hananu was forced to retreat to his village of Kafr Takharim Nahiyah and began to reorganize the revolt with Najeeb Oweid. The rebels decided to form a civilian government based in Armanaz Nahiyah, and sent Hananu to Turkey as a representative of the new civilian government to request for aid in fighting against the French. He received aid from the Turkish nationalist movement of Mustafa Kemal Atatürk, which was battling the French Army of the Levant for control of Cilicia and southern Anatolia. With the withdrawal of Turkish military assistance following the signing of the Franklin-Bouillon Agreement in October 1921, Hananu and his men could no longer sustain a revolt, and their struggle collapsed. However, the revolt's failure, the organization of the northern areas of Syria with Turkish help, has been interpreted as a prototype for self-government that Hananu and other Syrians built upon in later years.

In 1922 Ibrahim Hananu was arrested and presented to the French military criminal court on criminal acts.  The first session of the court was on 15 March 1922. One of the best lawyers at that time, Fathallah Saqqal defended Hananu, advocated for Hananu's innocence, and argued that Hananu was a political opponent, not a criminal.

On 25 March 1922, the French Attorney General requested the execution of Hananu, and he said, "if Hananu has seven heads, I will cut them all," the French judge ultimately released Hananu following an agreement between Hananu and the French government.

Hama (Fawzi al-Qawuqji) 

Fawzi al-Qawuqji was an officer in the Syrian army and the leader of the Salvation Army during the 1948 war, was born in the city of Tripoli in the Ottoman Empire, studied at the Military School in Astana, and graduated as an officer in the Ottoman Cavalry Corps in 1912, worked in the service of King Faisal in Damascus.

Fawzi al-Qawuqji lived in Damascus and was distinguished by his rare courage and Arabism that prompted him to fight battles against European colonialism in all Arab regions.

During the French Mandate, he became commander of a cavalry company in Hama, later defected from the Syrian Legion set up by the French in Syria to participate in the Great Syrian Revolution against the French, and on October 4, 1925, he led a revolution in Hama against the French occupation, which he planned jointly with Saeed Al-Termanini and Munir Al-Rayes. The Syrian revolutionaries took control of the city, the third-largest city in Syria, with about 80,000. The revolutionaries cut the telephone lines and attacked and burned the Government House, where they captured some French officers and then besieged the French military positions.

The next day, France bombarded the city with aircraft and artillery for three days. After negotiations, some of the city's notables persuaded al-Qawuqji to withdraw to save the population's blood, and the battles continued in its vicinity. The bombing of Hama resulted in 344 deaths, the vast majority of them civilians, although France claimed that the death toll did not exceed 76, all of whom were revolutionaries. Some sources estimate the number of civilian casualties at about 500, the losses of the French as 400 dead and wounded, and the losses of the rebels 35; the material losses were also great, as 115 shops were destroyed. He was later assigned to lead the revolution in the Ghouta area of Damascus.

The results of the revolution 

The revolution achieved great results in the national struggle and the quest for complete independence from France. The most prominent of these results are:

 These big moves greatly destabilized the policy of the French in Syria, and they became fully convinced that the people of Syria would not succumb and that a Syrian national government must be established and yielding to the will of the people and their great revolution. They also became fully convinced of the need to leave Syria and grant it complete independence. Representative Sixt Quantin proposed to return Syria and Lebanon to the custody of the League of Nations to get rid of the blood spilled in them and the expenses. His proposal won two hundred votes out of four hundred and eighty votes.
 The revolution led to the resurrection of the movement calling for the establishment of a royal government in Syria, as supporters of this project see it as the only guarantee for the establishment of sincere and continuous cooperation to implement the Mandate. Ali bin Al Hussein was the candidate for this throne, but the project failed due to the Syrians’ rejection.
 The revolution forced France to reunify Syria after dividing it into four states (Damascus, Aleppo, Jabal Alawites, and Jabal al-Druze).
 It was forced to agree to hold elections in which the national opposition, led by Ibrahim Hananu and Hashim al-Atassi, won.
 France was forced to carry out administrative reforms by removing its high commissioner and its military officers in Syria and appointing replacements for them, as happened, for example, with high commissioner Sarail after the revolutionaries attacked Qasr al-Azm in Damascus, so it set a new civilian delegate, de Jouvenel.
 France was forced to send its most prominent leaders in the First World War, such as General Gamelin, after the increasing strength of the revolutionaries and their victories.
 It paved the way for the final exit of the French from Syria in 1946, as the struggle continued in its political form.
 Damascus was bombed by air for 24 continuous hours, and some villages in Jabal al-Druze were emptied of their residents as a result of their destruction and burning.
 The revolution was a victory for national and patriotic awareness over regionalism and sectarianism, as the most important slogans launched by its leader were a religion for God and the homeland for all.

Martyrs of the Great Syrian Revolution 
The death toll of the Great Syrian Revolution reached 4,213 people, distributed in the following Syrian governorates:

 315 dead in Aleppo and Idlib
 331 dead in Latakia, Tartus and the coast
 731 dead in Damascus and Ghouta
 150 dead in Hama
 250 dead in Homs, Al-Nabek and An-Nabek District (Rif Dimashq Governorate)
 71 dead in Deir ez-Zor and Al Jazira
 34 dead in Daraa
 2,064 dead in Jabal al-Druze
 267 dead in the Al-Balan region, Rashaya, Majdal Shams and the surrounding villages

Memorial of the Great Syrian Revolution 
The building of the edifice consists of in its ground section the General Museum of the Great Syrian Revolution edifice, which is considered a living witness to the revolutionaries’ exploits and heroism in the face of French colonialism.

Next to the museum is located in the centre of the edifice a central hall that houses the remains of the commander in chief of the Great Syrian Revolution, the Mujahid Sultan al-Atrash, in addition to a mosaic panorama embodying the battles of the revolution and paintings documenting the names of the battles and the martyrs who were killed in them, in addition to an administration room, a library, and a special museum for the commander in chief containing the Arab dress. His complete cloak, dress, waistcoat, jacket, hat, weapons and military equipment, including a military rifle, a machine gun that he used, a hunting rifle, four machine guns, a French rifle, a leather belt to store bullets, a wooden stick in the form of a pin and some bullets, in addition to National Order of the Cedar that he was awarded, as well as two French swords, one of which belongs to a campaign leader. Blasphemy General Norman, a third sword sheath, two field phones, a signal pistol, three bullets, a detonator, a machine gun, and aircraft counters.

See also 
 Saleh al-Ali

References

Further reading 
 Daniel Neep,  Occupying Syria under the French mandate: insurgency, space and state formation (Cambridge University Press, 2012), pp 101–130.
 Michael Provence, The Great Syrian Revolt and the Rise of Arab Nationalism (University of Texas Press, 2005). online
 Anne-Marie Bianquis et Elizabeth Picard, Damas, miroir brisé d'un orient arabe, édition Autrement, Paris 1993.
 Lenka Bokova, La confrontation franco-syrienne à l'époque du mandat – 1925–1927, éditions l'Harmattan, Paris, 1990
 Général Andréa, La Révolte druze et l'insurrection de Damas, 1925–1926, éditions Payot, 1937
 Le Livre d'or des troupes du Levant : 1918–1936. <Avant-propos du général Huntziger.>, Préfacier Huntziger, Charles Léon Clément, Gal. (S. l.), Imprimerie du Bureau typographique des troupes du Levant, 1937.

Great Syrian Revolt
1925 in Mandatory Syria
1926 in Mandatory Syria
1927 in Mandatory Syria
Conflicts in 1925
Conflicts in 1926
Conflicts in 1927
Mandatory Syria
Military history of Syria
Military history of France
1920s in France
France–Syria relations
France–Lebanon relations
French Mandate for Syria and the Lebanon
League of Nations mandates
20th century in Lebanon
20th century in Syria
History of the Levant
Mandate for Syria
Mandate for Syria
Sykes–Picot Agreement